Catherine of Hanau also known as Katharina (25 January 1408 – 25 September 1460) was a German regent. She was the regent of the County of Rieneck during the minority of her son from 1431 until 1434. She was the eldest daughter of Reinhard II, who would become the first Count of Hanau in 1429, and Catherine of Nassau-Beilstein (d. 6 September 1459).

Countess of Rieneck 
She first married in 1421, to Count Thomas II of Rieneck (before 1408 – 8 February 1431), who was twice a widower at that time, having been married before to Elisabeth of Henneberg and to Elisabeth of Castell. His first two marriages were childless. Catherine and Thomas were engaged on 14 October 1419. After their marriage, the pair resided at Wildenstein Castle.

They had the following children:
 Philip the Elder, Count of Grünsfeld, Lauda and Wildenstein (d. 5 December 1488), married to Countess Palatine Amalia of Mosbach (1433 – 15 May 1483), a daughter of Count Palatine Otto I of Mosbach
 Philip the Younger, Count of Lohr, Gemünden, Brückenau and Schildeck (d. 14 July 1497), who joined the clergy, but reverted to a secular state in 1454 and married Margaret of Eppstein and then in 1465 to Anna of Wertheim-Breuberg.

Regency
After Thomas' death, Catherine became the guardian of her children, who were still minors. When she remarried, the guardianship and regency of Rieneck were taken up by her brother Reinhard III.

Countess of Henneberg-Schleusingen
In 1434, Catherine married Count William II of Henneberg-Schleusingen (14 March 1415 – 8 January 1444 in a hunting accident). Catherine and William were engaged on 17 May 1432. On 15 June 1432, Catherine renounced her claim on the County of Rieneck, in exchange for 8000 guilders. From her husband, she received a dowry of 16000 guilder, which was secured with the district and castle of Mainberg Castle, near Schweinfurt.

Catherine and William had the following children:
 William III (12 March 1434 – 26 May 1480), married Duches Margaret of Brunswick-Wolfenbüttel (1451 – 13 February 1509)
 Margaret (1437–1491), a nun in the Ilm Convent
 John II (2 July 1439 – 20 May 1513), from 1472 abbot of Fulda Abbey
 Berthold XII (b. 9 January 1441), clergyman
 Berthold XIV (4 March 1443 – 20 April 1495), provost of Bamberg
 Margaret (10 October 1444 – between 16 February and 3 March 1485), married Count Günther XXXVI of Schwarzburg-Blakenburg (8 July 1439 – 30 December 1503 in Rudolstadt)

Catherine died on 25 September 1460 Massfeld Castle in Untermassfeld.

Ancestors

References 
 Georg-Wilhelm Hanna: Katharina von Hanau, in: Mitteilungsblatt der Heimatstelle des Main-Kinzig-Kreises, issue 14, 1989, p. 201–203
 Georg-Wilhelm Hanna: Ministerialität, Macht und Mediatisierung. Die Ritteradligen von Hutten, ihre soziale Stellung in Kirche und Staat bis zum Ende des Alten Reiches, in the series Hanauer Geschichtsblätter, vol. 44, Hanau, 2007, also thesis, Bamberg, 2006 PDF 7024 kB
 W. Sattler: Das alte Schloß Mainberg bei Schweinfurt und seine Bewohner. Historische Skizze, new edition, 1854, p. 17ff
 Otto Schecher: Die Grafen von Rieneck. Studien zur Geschichte eines mittelalterlichen Hochadelsgeschlechtes in Franken, thesis, Würzburg, 1963
 Reinhard Suchier: Genealogie des Hanauer Grafenhauses, in: Festschrift des Hanauer Geschichtsvereins zu seiner fünfzigjährigen Jubelfeier am 27. August 1894, Hanau, 1894
 Ernst J. Zimmermann: Hanau Stadt und Land, 3rd ed., Hanau, 1919, reprinted: 1978

References 

15th-century German women
House of Hanau
People from Meiningen
German countesses
1408 births
1460 deaths
15th-century German people
15th-century women rulers